Kenneth Robert Ivory (born January 12, 1963) is an American attorney, politician, and lobbyist serving as a member of the Utah House of Representatives for the 47th district. Outside of politics, Ivory has lobbied on behalf of the American Lands Council and Convention of States.

Early life education
Ivory was born in Mount Pleasant, Utah. He earned a bachelor of arts degree in Japanese from Brigham Young University and a juris doctor from the California Western School of Law.

Career
Ivory is the president of Ivory Law and the American Lands Council. ALC is a controversial non-profit organization (founded by Ivory) to promote Ivory's desire to see states assume control of federal lands within state's boundaries. Ivory and ALC have been the subject of complaints filed with Utah's attorney general, citing Ivory's conflict of interest for writing legislation to benefit ALC while he was a sitting legislator. ALC has paid Ivory a wage over $100,000 while also paying Ivory's wife Rebecca nearly $20,000 for working as ALC's communications director. He was elected to the Utah House of Representatives in November 2010 and assumed office on January 1, 2011. He left office in August 2019 to take a position with the Utah-based corporation, Geomancer. In November 2021, Ivory was re-appointed to his old seat in the House after Steve Christiansen resigned.

Committee assignments 
During the 2016 legislative session, Ivory served on the Natural Resources, Agriculture, and Environmental Quality Appropriations Subcommittee, the House Public Utilities (which he was the chair), the House Revenue and Taxation Committee, and the House Natural Resources, Agriculture, and Environment Committee. During the interim, Ivory serves on the Revenue and Taxation Interim Committee, and the Public Utilities, Energy, and Technology Interim Committee. He is also a member of the Commission for the Stewardship of Public Lands, Commission on Federalism and the Federal Funds Commission.

Transfer of Public Lands Act 
Representative Ivory is a strong supporter of states' rights and has frequently advocated for Utah to gain control of federal lands. In 2012, Ivory sponsored HB 148, the Utah Transfer of Public Lands Act, which asserted that the federal government must grant federal land to the state of Utah. Though the bill was signed into law in 2012, federal lands have remained in control of the United States Department of the Interior.

Since the federal lands have not been relinquished to Utah, in December 2015 the state legislature has voted to pursue a lawsuit against the federal government.

Elections 
2022: Ivory won the race for District 39 in the November 8 general election.
2014: Ivory was unopposed for the 2014 Republican Convention and won the November 4, 2014 General election with 4,634 votes (65.8%) against Democratic nominee Alena M. Balmforth.
2012: Ivory was unopposed for the June 26, 2012 Republican Primary and won the three-way November 6, 2012 General election with 7,354 votes (62.5%) against Democratic nominee Joseph Huey and Libertarian candidate Chase Lantis.
2010: Ivory challenged District 47 incumbent Republican Representative Steven Mascaro and was chosen by the Republican convention for the November 2, 2010 General election; Ivory won with 4,384 votes (61%) against Democratic nominee John Rendell, who had run for a Utah State Senate seat in 2008.

Personal life 
Ivory lives in West Jordan, Utah.

Family Relations 
Ken Ivory is related to Clark Ivory, who owns Ivory Homes. Both grew up in the small town of Mount Pleasant in Sanpete County, Utah—where their family has lived since the early 1900s Ken Ivory's father, Rex Clair Ivory, is the third cousin of Clark Ivory.

References

External links
Official page at the Utah State Legislature
Campaign site

Ken Ivory at Ballotpedia
Ken Ivory at the National Institute on Money in State Politics
The American Lands Council at webpage www.moneytrails.org

1963 births
Living people
Brigham Young University alumni
California Western School of Law alumni
Republican Party members of the Utah House of Representatives
People from West Jordan, Utah
Utah lawyers
21st-century American politicians
21st-century American lawyers